Emanuil Gojdu National College is a high school located in Oradea, Romania. It is named after Emanoil Gojdu. The College has a long history in teaching being focused on science/real subjects. "Țara visurilor noastre" is its official magazine.

The school building, with a construction date of 1895-1896, is listed as a historic monument by Romania's Ministry of Culture and Religious Affairs.

References

External links
 Official site

Educational institutions established in 1919
Schools in Bihor County
Historic monuments in Bihor County
National Colleges in Romania
Education in Oradea
1919 establishments in Romania
School buildings completed in 1896